Nyêmo Chekar monastery ཉེ་མོ་ཆེ་དཀར་དགོན། is a small Buddhist monastery of the Bodongpa tradition in Nyêmo County, Lhasa, Tibet.
It is known for its mural paintings of reincarnations of the Samding Dorje Phagmo.

Location

Nyemo Chekar lies near Uyuk in Nyêmo County. It is the birthplace of 8th century "translator" Vairotsana.
The name comes from an area of chekar (bye dkar), or white sand, that surrounds the monastery.
The monastery was established in the 16th century by Tashi Ombar, protector of the Bodongpa tradition, and Chime Palsang, spiritual master of the tradition.
A visitor to the monastery in July 1996 described it as small and somewhat decrepit.
It stood on a mound above a grove of willows and a small stream.

Paintings

The old wall paintings in the porch of the temple had been repainted by 1996.
In a dark altar room on the ground floor the walls are completely decorated with much older portraits that included Bodong Chogle Namgyal (1376–1451), the deity Dorje Phagmo and Tashi Ombar, the blue horseman who protects the Bodongpa tradition. One of the better-preserved upper rooms also has fully decorated walls, including formal portraits of Bodong Chogle Namgyal, Chökyi Drönma (the first incarnation of Dorje Phagmo) and Chime Palsang. It has various other pictures of women, some remarkably realistic. One depicts the princess Chökyi Drönma in a nun's garb, with a yogini's long hair hanging loose, wearing gold and turquoise earrings. Although unnamed, most of the female portraits appear to represent different reincarnations of the Dorje Phagmo.
They probably date from the late 16th or early 17th century.

References

Sources

Buddhist monasteries in Lhasa (prefecture-level city)
Tibetan Buddhist monasteries and temples